Guns at Batasi is a 1964 British drama film starring Richard Attenborough, Jack Hawkins, Flora Robson, John Leyton and Mia Farrow. The film is based on the 1962 novel The Siege of Battersea by Robert Holles and was directed by John Guillermin. Although the action is set in an overseas colonial military outpost during the last days of the British Empire in East Africa, filming happened at Pinewood Studios in the United Kingdom.

Plot
Guns of Batasi depicts an erupting world where newly empowered forces, both black and white, embrace the realpolitik of a post-colonial world. A group of veteran British NCOs, headed by upright Regimental Sergeant Major Lauderdale (Richard Attenborough), becomes entangled with a coup in an unnamed African state, recently-independent and dogged by political intrigue. The unnamed country is evocative of Kenya in east Africa: RSM Lauderdale mentions the Turkana peoples (who live in Kenya), native soldiers speak in Kiswahili, the lingua franca of the Kenyan region, and aspects of the story echo Kenya's troubled post-independence era, including the 1957 Mau Mau Uprising. Throughout, the story contrasts professional British NCOs and their officers with the inexperienced African soldiers and their officers.

After the post-colonial government is overthrown native troops supporting the new regime seize control of Batasi, a King's African Rifles army base. They seize weapons and arrest the newly appointed African commanding officer, Captain Abraham (Earl Cameron). With British NCOs isolated in their mess, action concentrates around their protection of the wounded Captain Abraham. This defence is complicated by Ms Barker-Wise, a visiting British MP (Flora Robson) and Karen Eriksson, a UN secretary (Mia Farrow), the latter providing some love interest.

Eventually, the country's new administration allows British officers to return to the Batasi barracks and end the siege, although not before the NCOs destroy two Bofors guns targeting their mess. The film ends with the new government restoring amicable relations with the British Commonwealth, but on condition that RSM Lauderdale leaves the country. RSM Lauderdale loses his cool (the only time he has done so throughout) and flings a shot glass, to his horror accidentally breaking a framed portrait of Her Majesty The Queen, a treasured centrepiece behind the bar. Regaining his composure, the resigned Lauderdale marches across the parade ground as a military march swells.

Cast

Production

Writing
The novel was originally published in 1962. It was adapted as a screenplay by Robert Holles, from an original adaptation credited to Leo Marks, Marshall Pugh, and C. M. Pennington-Richards.

Pre-production
The film was originally to be made by Roy and John Boulting, who wanted to make a return to drama after a series of comedies. "We think the time is ripe for us to return to the serious subject", said Roy Boulting.

Roy Boulting said he intended to start filming in August 1963 at Shepperton Studios with four weeks location filming in West Africa. The budget of $1 million was to be provided by Bryanston Films and British Lion. However the film would eventually instead be made by John Guillermin and 20th Century Fox.

Filming
The film, which was made in CinemaScope, was made entirely at Pinewood Studios between February and April, 1964 although it was set in tropical Africa (it was made at the same time as Goldfinger). The exterior night scenes were filmed on a sound stage and the opening scenes were shot on Salisbury Plain.

Britt Ekland was originally cast as Karen Eriksson but pulled out three weeks into production. The Swedish actress had just married Peter Sellers who apparently was so paranoid about her having an affair with Leyton he secretly asked his old acting friends, David Lodge and Graham Stark who were co-starring in the picture, to spy on his new wife. After being quizzed nightly on the telephone by Sellers about her scenes and who she was with, Ekland left the shoot to join Sellers in Los Angeles. Ekland has said that Sellers insisted that she leave the set, come to Los Angeles, then claim that an illness prevented her from returning. Her role was quickly recast and completed by Farrow. In response 20th Century Fox sued Ekland for $1.5 million; Sellers counter-sued for $4 million claiming the Fox suit caused him "mental distress and injury to his health".

Heavy drinker and three-packets-a-day smoker Jack Hawkins' voice is audibly fraying: it was almost the last film he made before surgery for throat cancer removed his vocal cords and left him with little more than a whisper.

Fresh off years at Ealing Studios, cinematographer Douglas Slocombe photographed the film.

Reception

Box Office
According to Fox records, the film needed to earn $1,400,000 in film rentals to break even and made $1,845,000, meaning it made a profit.

Critical
Filmink says "A subject like this is a political minefield, with its hot topic subjects of imperialism, militarism, race, emerging democracies, etc. It works best as a siege story, on which basis it is very exciting."

Attenborough won a BAFTA Film Award for his performance as the R.S.M.

The historian Wendy Webster has more recently reflected that 'The film continuously asserts the racial superiority of the British and at the same time shows that such superiority no longer provides any guarantee of authority or power. Guns at Batasi is an elegy for the soldier hero, particularly the imperial soldier, and is infused by imperial nostalgia.'

Soundtrack
The score was recorded by the Sinfonia of London orchestra.

Home media
The DVD commentary on the making of the film is narrated by John Leyton.

References

External links
 

 
 
 

1964 films
1960s war drama films
20th Century Fox films
CinemaScope films
British war drama films
British black-and-white films
Films based on British novels
British Empire war films
Films scored by John Addison
Films set in Africa
Films directed by John Guillermin
Films shot at Pinewood Studios
1964 drama films
1960s English-language films
1960s British films